Aatami (Finnish: Adam) was a Finnish language men's magazine that was in circulation between 1944 and 1954 and was the first magazine specifically targeted male readers in Finland. The first issue appeared in December 1944. The magazine considered its readers as fellow soldiers who returned home from World War II and now attempted to create a peaceful society in Finland. However, if the soldiers committed crimes, Aatami called them hooligans who were not genuine frontline soldiers.

It had an anti-communist political stance and mostly featured the views of non-socialist figures. In addition, Aatami attempted to improve the negative images of Finnish men who had been portrayed as heavy drunks and discussed the moral and sexual codes for men.

References

1944 establishments in Finland
1954 disestablishments in Finland
Defunct magazines published in Finland
Finnish-language magazines
Magazines established in 1944
Magazines disestablished in 1954
Men's magazines published in Finland